Rolling Hills is an unincorporated community in Charlestown Township, Clark County, Indiana, United States.

Geography

References

Unincorporated communities in Clark County, Indiana
Unincorporated communities in Indiana
Louisville metropolitan area